INS Suvarna (P52) is a Sukanya class patrol vessel of the Indian Navy.

INS Suvarna has been modified for use as a test bed for the launch of the ship-based Dhanush short-range ballistic missile.

On 19 April 2021, INS Suvarna, while on a surveillance patrol in the Arabian Sea, seized narcotics worth ₹3000 crore being transported on a fishing vessel.

References

Sukanya-class patrol vessels
Naval ships of India
1990 ships